Dipterocarpus hasseltii is a species of tree in the family Dipterocarpaceae. This large tree occurs in lowland dipterocarp forest and is cut for keruing timber. It is found in Indonesia (Bali, Java, Kalimantan, Sumatra), Peninsular Malaysia, Sabah, the Philippines, Thailand and Vietnam.

References

hasseltii
Trees of Malesia
Trees of Indo-China